Patterned by Nature was commissioned by the North Carolina Museum of Natural Sciences in Raleigh, North Carolina. This piece was a collaboration between Hypersonic, Sosolimited, and Plebian Design. 10 feet wide and 90 feet in length, this sculptural ribbon winds through a five story atrium of the newly built Nature Research Center museum expansion. "The exhibit celebrates the abstraction of nature's infinite complexity into patterns through the scientific process. It brings to light the similarity of patterns in our universe, across all scales of space and time.", says Bill Washabaugh, one of the project designers.  The ribbon is made of 3,600 tiles of individually dimmable LCD glass, and runs on a total of about 75 watts of power.

External links
The Verge News - Patterned By Nature
Vice News - - Patterned By Nature
Installation art works